Andries Nicolaas den Houting (1 November 1901 – 2 December 1975) was a Canadian cyclist. He competed in the team pursuit event at the 1928 Summer Olympics.

References

External links
 

1901 births
1975 deaths
Canadian male cyclists
Olympic cyclists of Canada
Cyclists at the 1928 Summer Olympics
Sportspeople from Haarlem
Dutch emigrants to Canada
Dutch male cyclists
Cyclists from North Holland
20th-century Canadian people